Bruno Chizzo (19 April 1916 – 14 August 1969) was an Italian association footballer who played as a midfielder.

Club career
Born in Udine, Chizzo played in the 1930s and 1940s for Triestina, A.C. Milan, Genoa, Anconitana, and Udinese. He played 195 matches in Serie A and scored 18 goals.

International career
With the Italy national football team, he was the youngest player selected to the 1938 FIFA World Cup squad and became world champion despite not playing a game throughout the tournament.

Honours

Club
Udinese
 Serie A: 1934–35

International
Italy
 FIFA World Cup: 1938

References
 La Gazzetta dello Sport

1916 births
1969 deaths
Genoa C.F.C. players
Sportspeople from Udine
Italian footballers
Association football midfielders
Serie A players
A.C. Milan players
Udinese Calcio players
U.S. Triestina Calcio 1918 players
1938 FIFA World Cup players
FIFA World Cup-winning players
Footballers from Friuli Venezia Giulia